Florin Segărceanu (born 29 March 1961) is a former tennis player from Romania.

When John McEnroe won Wimbledon in 1983, Segărceanu was the only player to take a set off McEnroe throughout the entire championship when he won the first set of their second round match.

Segărceanu defeated Brian Teacher, then ranked 22nd, at Cincinnati in 1983; Paul Annacone, then ranked 25th, in the opening round at Roland Garros in 1985; Martín Jaite, then ranked 20th, at Tel Aviv in 1985; and Guy Forget, then ranked 28th, at Nice in 1986.

His career prize money total was $192,212, with 1985's being his highest earning year at $25,138.

Career finals

Doubles (1 title, 5 runner-ups)

References

External links

 
 
 

1961 births
Living people
Romanian male tennis players
Universiade medalists in tennis
Tennis players from Bucharest
Universiade gold medalists for Romania
Universiade silver medalists for Romania
Universiade bronze medalists for Romania
Medalists at the 1979 Summer Universiade
Medalists at the 1981 Summer Universiade
Medalists at the 1985 Summer Universiade